Aleksei Nikolayevich Kenyaykin (born 23 August 1998) is a Russian football player. He plays for FC Orenburg.

Club career
He made his debut in the Russian Professional Football League for FC Orenburg-2 on 18 August 2017 in a game against FC Anzhi-Yunior Zelenodolsk.

On 4 July 2019, he joined FC Torpedo Moscow on loan for the 2019–20 season. He made his Russian Football National League debut for Torpedo on 28 July 2019 in a game against FC Nizhny Novgorod.

Kenyaykin made his Russian Premier League debut for FC Orenburg on 3 September 2022 against FC Khimki.

Career statistics

References

External links
 

1998 births
Sportspeople from Samara, Russia
Living people
Russian footballers
Association football goalkeepers
FC Orenburg players
FC Torpedo Moscow players
Russian Premier League players
Russian First League players
Russian Second League players